John Ponsonby (1874 – 1962) was a footballer who played in the Football League for Stoke.

Career
Ponsonby was born in Dumbarton, Scotland to Irish parents and moved over to Belfast where he played for Distillery. He joined Stoke in 1897 and played five matches during the 1897–98 season before returning to Distillery. He won the Irish League four times (1895–96, 1898–99, 1900–01, 1902–03) across his two spells, and lifted the Irish Cup in 1896.

Career statistics

Club

International
Source:

References

1874 births
1962 deaths
Sportspeople from Dumbarton
Footballers from West Dunbartonshire
Irish association footballers (before 1923)
Pre-1950 IFA international footballers
Lisburn Distillery F.C. players
Stoke City F.C. players
English Football League players
Association football defenders
Association football wing halves
NIFL Premiership players
Irish League representative players
Scottish footballers
Association footballers from Belfast